Bratian  is a village in the administrative district of Gmina Nowe Miasto Lubawskie, within Nowe Miasto County, Warmian-Masurian Voivodeship, in northern Poland. The village has a population of approximately 1,600.

Near the village is National Road 15. From 1975 to 1998 the village was in Toruń Voivodeship.

References

Bratian